Jean Desnouelles was a 19th-century French abbot and chronicler. He was the Abbot of St. Vincent, Laon and author of numerous works. Desnouelles's Chronicon documented Norman and medieval France and he appears to have been an expert on France in the medieval period.

References

French abbots
19th-century French historians
French chroniclers
People from Laon
French medievalists
French male non-fiction writers